On August 30, 2022, 20-year-old African-American man Donovan Lewis (born ) was shot and killed by Officer Ricky Anderson of the Columbus Division of Police (CDP) in the Hilltop neighborhood of Columbus, Ohio as officers served a warrant at his apartment. Police were serving a warrant against Lewis for domestic violence against his pregnant girlfriend and assault and improper handling of a firearm. After officers detained two men at the apartment, police opened the door to Lewis's bedroom, after which point Anderson fired a single shot at Lewis who was in his own bed.

Incident 
At about 2:00 AM on August 30, 2022, Columbus Police served a warrant at Lewis's apartment in the Hilltop neighborhood for improperly handling a firearm, assault, and domestic violence. Officers knocked on the front door for eight to ten minutes before a resident of the apartment opened the door. Police detained him and another resident. Police released a canine unit which walked into the kitchen before approaching and barking at Lewis's bedroom door. Officer Ricky Anderson, a 30-year veteran of the department, opened the bedroom door and immediately fired once, hitting Lewis. Police claim Lewis was holding a vape pen in his hands but it is not visible in the recording. Police handcuffed Lewis and carried him outside the apartment, where they performed CPR. Lewis was transported to a hospital and later pronounced dead.

Investigation 
Body camera footage of the shooting was released the same day as the shooting, along with footage of two recent non-fatal Columbus Police shootings. The Ohio Bureau of Criminal Investigation is investigating the shooting.

On October 25, the Franklin County Coroner's Office ruled Lewis' death a homicide.

On March 3, 2023, Anderson retired from the CDP "in bad standing", due to the ongoing investigations into Lewis's death.

Reaction 
Protests were held outside the Columbus Police headquarters on September 2.

Lewis's family hired attorney Rex Elliott of Cooper Elliot Personal Injury Lawyers. A press conference was held at a downtown Columbus hotel on September 1. Elliott stated Lewis's family anticipates filing an action against Anderson.

The Brady Campaign and the NAACP released statements condemning the shooting.

On September 7, the Columbus Division of Police Chief Elaine Bryant announced the department would no longer execute pre-planned arrest warrants at private homes for misdemeanor offenses unless it is approved by a lieutenant or someone with a higher authority. The change does not apply to SWAT or task force personnel.

See also
 2020–2022 United States racial unrest
 Killing of Andre Hill
 List of killings by law enforcement officers in the United States, August 2022

References 

2022 controversies in the United States
2022 in Ohio
21st century in Columbus, Ohio
African-American-related controversies
Black Lives Matter
Deaths by firearm in Ohio
Deaths by person in Ohio
Filmed killings by law enforcement
Law enforcement controversies in the United States
August 2022 events in the United States
African Americans shot dead by law enforcement officers in the United States